The following table compares EPA's estimated out-of-pocket fuel costs and fuel economy ratings of serial production plug-in hybrid electric vehicles rated by EPA  expressed in miles per gallon gasoline equivalent (mpg-e), See pp. 27-28 for all-electric vehicles and pp. 30-31 for plug-in hybrid electric vehicles. See the tab "Cars excl. EVs"  - The Prius c is the most fuel efficient in the compact class and the conventional Prius is the most fuel efficient in the midsize class, and both rank ahead of the most fuel efficient in any other clars. The table also shows the fuel efficiency for plug-in hybrids in all-electric mode expressed as KWh/100 mile, the metric used by EPA to rate electric cars before November 2010.

References

Plug-in hybrid vehicles

Hybrid electric cars

Costs